is a Paralympic swimmer from Japan competing mainly in category S13 events.

Shusaku was a member of the Japanese swimming team at the 2004 Summer Paralympics he competed in a total of six events. He won bronze as part of the Japanese  freestyle team and finished fourth as part of the  medley team. He also swam in the 50m freestyle, 100m freestyle, failing to make the final in either. He finished eighth in the 100m butterfly and fifth in the 100m breaststroke.

References

External links
 

Year of birth missing (living people)
Living people
Japanese male breaststroke swimmers
Japanese male butterfly swimmers
Japanese male freestyle swimmers
Paralympic swimmers of Japan
Paralympic bronze medalists for Japan
Paralympic medalists in swimming
Swimmers at the 2004 Summer Paralympics
Medalists at the 2004 Summer Paralympics
S13-classified Paralympic swimmers
20th-century Japanese people
21st-century Japanese people